The Ernest Mario School of Pharmacy (EMSOP) is the pharmacy school of Rutgers University. It was founded in 1892 and merged with Rutgers University in 1927 as the Rutgers College of Pharmacy. In 1971, the school moved to its current location. In 2003, the school was renamed as the Ernest Mario School of Pharmacy in recognition of Ernest Mario's contributions to the pharmaceutical industry and the school. As of 2015 it was tied as the 26th ranked pharmacy school in the US.

See also
List of pharmacy schools

References

External links
Ernest Mario School of Pharmacy official website

Pharmacy schools in New Jersey
Rutgers University colleges and schools
Educational institutions established in 1892
1892 establishments in New Jersey